Amy S. Gladfelter (born April 27, 1974) is an American quantitative cell biologist who is interested in understanding fundamental mechanisms of cell organization. She is a Professor of Biology and the Associate Chair for Diversity Initiatives at the University of North Carolina at Chapel Hill, where she investigates cell cycle control and the septin cytoskeleton. She is also affiliated with the Lineberger Comprehensive Cancer Center and is a fellow of the Marine Biological Laboratory in Woods Hole, MA.

Gladfelter studies the spatial organization of multinucleate cells, including syncitia, cells with many nuclei that share a common cytoplasm.  Her lab at UNC Chapel Hill is broadly interested in understanding why syncytia have arisen in diverse contexts within the tree of life.  Syncytial cells are found throughout the human body, including in bone, blood, muscle, and placental tissue, and throughout the natural world, including in fungi, algae and in many animals during their development. Many tumors become syncytial, while certain viruses, including SARS-CoV-2, can induce cells to fuse. 
Additionally, Gladfelter studies the assembly of the septin cytoskeleton and how aberrant septin structure affects its function.  Her research program uses microscopy, biophysical and genetic approaches to study cell biology.

Education
Amy Gladfelter trained at Princeton University (AB) with Bonnie Bassler, at Duke University (Ph.D.) with Daniel Lew and at UniBasel Biozentrum (post-doc) with Peter Philippsen before starting her independent career at Dartmouth in the Biological Sciences department in 2006, where she remained until 2016.

Cell biology research
The two main research focuses of the Gladfelter lab are how the cytoplasm is spatially organized and how cells sense their own geometry. Her team uses a variety of model systems to study syncytia, including Ashbya gossypii, Neurospora crassa, myotubes and the syncytiotrophoblast of human placenta to study the architecture of the cytoplasm. Gladfelter is also seeking out new fungal systems derived from the marine environment that are extremophiles and show morphologic characteristics not found in more conventional model systems.

Gladfelter made the discovery that the nuclei of the multinucleate fungus Ashbya gossypii, despite sharing the same cytoplasm,  progress through the cell cycle independently. This has led to further work uncovering how liquid-liquid phase separation of RNAs and proteins can permit autonomy among syncytial nuclei and help to establish cell polarity. Recently, the lab has begun examining phase separation in the context of SARS-CoV-2 infection, with a focus on understanding mechanisms of viral packaging.

Another area that Gladfelter's lab explores is how cells sense their shape. Gladfelter and her lab have extensively studied the ability of a conserved family of proteins called septins, which localize to areas of the cell that change shape or are highly curved, to sense cell curvature.

Awards and honors 
 NSF Post-Doctoral Fellow (2002–2005)
 Roche Research Foundation Fellow (2002–2003)
 Basil O’Connor Scholar, March of Dimes (2008–2010)
 Lemann, Colwin and Spiegel research awards, Marine Biological Lab, Woods Hole, MA (2010, 2011, 2012)
 Karen E. Wetterhahn Memorial Award for Distinguished Creative and Scholarly Achievement (2012)
 Douglas C. Floren Fellow (2012–2013)
 Nikon Fellow, MBL, Woods Hole, MA (2013)
 Dartmouth Graduate Advising Mentoring Award (2014)
 American Society for Cell Biology, 2015 WICB Mid-Career Award for Excellence in Research Achievement (2015)
 HHMI Faculty Scholar (2016)

Selected works 

On cytoplasmic organization

 
 
 
 
 
 

On cell shape and septin assembly

References

21st-century American biologists
American women biologists
1974 births
University of North Carolina at Chapel Hill faculty
Cell biologists
Princeton University alumni
Duke University alumni
People from Philadelphia
Scientists from Philadelphia
Dartmouth College faculty
Living people
American women academics
21st-century American women scientists